Croydon Minster is the parish and civic church of the London Borough of Croydon. There are currently more than 35 churches in the borough, with Croydon Minster being the most prominent. It is Grade I listed.

Six Archbishops of Canterbury are buried in the church: Edmund Grindal (d.1583), John Whitgift (d.1604), Gilbert Sheldon (d.1677), William Wake (d.1737), John Potter (d.1747), and Thomas Herring (d.1757).

History

Medieval church
The church was established in the middle Saxon period, and is believed to have been a minster church: one which served as a base for a group of clergy living a communal life, who may have taken some pastoral responsibility for the population of the surrounding district. A charter issued by King Coenwulf of Mercia refers to a council which had taken place close to what is called the monasterium (meaning minster) of Croydon. An Anglo-Saxon will made in about 960 is witnessed by Elfsies, priest of Croydon; and the church is also mentioned in Domesday Book (1086).

The earliest clear record of the church's dedication to St John the Baptist is found in the will of John de Croydon, fishmonger, dated 6 December 1347, which includes a bequest to "the church of S. John de Croydon".

In its final medieval form, the church was mainly a Perpendicular-style structure of late 14th and early 15th-century date. It still bears the arms of archbishops Courtenay and Chichele, believed to have been its benefactors.

Destruction and rebuilding

The medieval building underwent some restoration in 1851 and 1857–9, under the direction of George Gilbert Scott. However, on the night of 5 January 1867, a fire broke out – possibly caused by overheating of the poorly positioned flues of recently installed Gurney stoves – which eventually gutted the entire building. It was rebuilt to Scott's designs between 1867 and 1869, incorporating some of the medieval remains (notably the west tower and south porch), and essentially following the medieval plan, while enlarging the building by extending its footprint further east. During the period of rebuilding, services were held in a temporary "iron church", with seating for 700, erected in April 1868 in Scarbrook Road.

The church's reconsecration by Archbishop Archibald Tait took place on 5 January 1870. The church still contains several important monuments and fittings saved from the old building.

Present day
The church was elevated to the status of Croydon Minster (the modern honorific title) on 29 May 2011, the first such change in the diocese of Southwark.

Croydon has strong religious links, Croydon Palace having been a residence of the Archbishop of Canterbury from at least the beginning of the 13th century to the beginning of the 19th. The Bishop of Croydon is a position as an area bishop in the Anglican Diocese of Southwark. The current area bishop is Jonathan Clark, who was consecrated on 21 March 2012. Until recently (mid 2016) the vicar was Colin J. Luke Boswell, Vicar of Croydon and Chaplain to the Whitgift Foundation.

Croydon Minster today de facto serves as Whitgift School's chapel. It is also linked to The Minster Schools.

The Minster stands in the inclusive liberal catholic tradition of the Church of England.

Organ
The church has a large four-manual pipe organ, much of which is by William Hill & Sons and dates from 1869. There is also a small organ in the St Nicholas Chapel which was obtained from St Mary the Virgin, Preston Candover in 1997.

Organists and Masters of Choristers

Before the fire of 1867 records are incomplete, but include:

Thomas Attwood Walmisley 1830–1833
John Pyke Hullah 1837–?

After the fire of 1867:

John Rhodes 1857–1868
Frederick Cambridge 1868–1911
F. Rowland Tims 1911–1918
H. Leslie Smith 1918–1948
Edward Shakespeare 1948–1952
J. A. Rogans (Hon) 1952–1953
B. Aldersea 1952–1957
J. A. Rogans (Hon) 1957–1958
Derek Holman 1958–1965
Roy Massey 1965–1968
Michael Fleming 1968–1978
David Brookshaw 1978–1980
Simon Lole 1980–1985
Carl Jackson 1986–1990
David Swinson 1990–1992
Peter Nardone 1993–2000
Nigel McClintock 2000–2007
Andrew Cantrill 2008–2012
Tom Little (Acting) 2012–2013
Dr Ronny Krippner 2013–2021
Sophie Garbisu (Acting) 2021–2022
Justin Miller 2022–

Organists Laureate

Martin How 2011–2022

Organists Emeritus

Derek Holman 2011–2019
Roy Massey 2011–

Bells

The tower houses a ring of 12 bells cast by the Croydon firm of Gillett & Johnston in 1936, replacing an earlier ring of eight. The eight original bells were recast and hung with new fittings in a new frame with four additional trebles. The new ring of 12 was dedicated by the Bishop of Croydon on 12 December 1936 and the first peal on the new 12 was rung for the coronation of King George VI and Queen Elizabeth in 1937.

The tower and ringers are affiliated to the Surrey Association of Church Bell Ringers.

St. Johns Memorial Garden

Up until 1957 it was a traditional cemetery which was no longer used and had become neglected. Earlier gravestones and tombs were relocated or used for walling or paving and a War Memorial was also repositioned.

Gallery

References

Further reading

External links 

 
Croydon bell ringers website

Churches completed in 1870
19th-century Church of England church buildings
Burned buildings and structures in the United Kingdom
Rebuilt churches in the United Kingdom
Church of England church buildings in the London Borough of Croydon
History of the London Borough of Croydon
Grade I listed buildings in the London Borough of Croydon
Anglican Diocese of Southwark
Anglo-Catholic church buildings in the London Borough of Croydon